William (17 August 1153 – 1156) was the first son of King Henry II of England and Duchess Eleanor of Aquitaine. He was born in Normandy on the same day that his father's rival, Eustace IV of Boulogne, died.

William either died aged 3 on 2 December 1156, or aged 2 in April 1156. This was due to a seizure at Wallingford Castle, and he was buried in Reading Abbey at the feet of his great-grandfather Henry I.

At the time of his death, William was reigning as Count of Poitiers, as his mother had ceded the county to him. For centuries, the dukes of Aquitaine had held this as one of their minor titles, so it had passed to Eleanor from her father; giving it to her son was effectively a revival of the title, separating it from the duchy. Some authorities say he also held the title of "Archbishop of York", but this is probably an error. His half-brother Geoffrey (died 1212), who was born a year before William, later held that office, causing the confusion.

References

Sources

1153 births
1156 deaths
12th-century English people
Heirs to the English throne
Heirs apparent who never acceded
William
Burials at Reading Abbey
William
Children of Henry II of England
Royalty and nobility who died as children
Sons of kings